Changeling: The Dreaming is a tabletop role-playing game in the World of Darkness series, where players take the roles of changelings. It was first released by White Wolf Publishing in 1995, and released in new editions in 1997 (second edition) and 2017 (20th Anniversary Edition), which brought updates to the game rules. These have been supported with supplementary game books, expanding the game mechanics and setting. The books from the game's original run in 1995–2001 were published by White Wolf Publishing, whereas the books for the 20th Anniversary Edition were published by Onyx Path Publishing, a company formed by ex–White Wolf Publishing staff.

The supplements include the Kithbook series, describing the different types of fae; the Book of Houses line, describing noble houses; sourcebooks about character types and factions; books describing locations as they are portrayed in the setting; game guides; and various other books. The line was well regarded by critics for its artwork and for evocative writing; it was also commercially successful, but not enough to warrant being developed on the higher budget at which White Wolf Publishing normally operated, leading it to be moved to their lower-budget imprint Arthaus in 1998, where it performed well.

Books

First edition (1995–1997)

Second edition (1997–2001)

20th Anniversary Edition (2017–2019)

Notes

References

External links
 Official Changeling: The Dreaming website

Changeling: The Dreaming
Changeling: The Dreaming
Changeling: The Dreaming